Phyllocnistis canariensis is a moth of the family Gracillariidae. It is known from the Canary Islands and Madeira.

The larvae feed on Salix canariensis. They mine the leaves of their host plant. The mine consists of a very long gallery in the epidermis of a branch, eventually ascending along the petiole and ending in an upper-surface pupal chamber between the midrib and the leaf margin.

References

Phyllocnistis